Leonard Mario Strizu (born 26 August 1967) is a Romanian former footballer who played as a forward, who is currently in charge of Liga I club FCSB as a manager. After he retired from playing football, Strizu worked as a sports director at Steaua București, manager at Steaua București II and started his own business, a company that produces pickles. In September 2021, after ten years of inactivity, he was appointed manager at Liga II club, Unirea Constanța.

Conviction
In 2005 Strizu was arrested for influence peddling. In 2007 he was sentenced to a three-year suspended sentence.

Career statistics

Managerial

Honours

Player
Mecanică Fină București
Divizia C: 1988–89
Politehnica Timișoara
Divizia B: 1994–95
FC Brașov
Divizia B: 1998–99

Manager
Steaua II București
Liga III: 2008–09

References

External links

1967 births
Living people
Romanian footballers
Association football forwards
Liga I players
Liga II players
Liga III players
Süper Lig players
FC Rapid București players
FC Unirea Urziceni players
FC Sportul Studențesc București players
FC Progresul București players
FC Politehnica Timișoara players
FC Brașov (1936) players
FCM Târgoviște players
Kayseri Erciyesspor footballers
Sakaryaspor footballers
Romanian expatriate footballers
Expatriate footballers in Turkey
Expatriate sportspeople in Turkey
Romanian expatriate sportspeople in Turkey
Romanian football managers
FC Unirea Constanța managers
FC Steaua București managers
Liga I managers
Romanian sports executives and administrators
Romanian businesspeople
Sportspeople from Timișoara